Allegory of Vanity and Repentance is a 1616 oil painting by the Dutch artist Cornelis van Haarlem. It is now in the Musée des Beaux-Arts of Strasbourg, France. Its inventory number is 1969. The painting's lesser known and lesser used title is Human Love and Divine Love; it was also known in the past as Pagan Life and Christian Life. Although the Dutch Republic was mostly Protestant in 1616, van Haarlem's painting was made for a Catholic patron.

The foreground of the painting depicts a couple: a woman with a mirror and bare breasts, who personfies Vanitas; and a musician looking at the viewer, who personifies fleeting pleasure, as in the sounds of his instrument. On a table in front of them lay a crown, golden coins, and other precious wordly objects, such as a hanap. A bearded monk looking through the window attracts the viewer's attention by pointing towards Jesus praying in the Garden; his outstretched right hand towards the couple signifies that they may join him through repentance and be saved.

References

External links

Paintings in the collection of the Musée des Beaux-Arts de Strasbourg
1616 paintings
Paintings by Cornelis van Haarlem
Oil paintings
17th-century allegorical paintings
Mannerist paintings